Wetherill Park is a suburb in Greater Western Sydney, in the state of New South Wales, Australia. Wetherill Park is located 34 kilometres west of the Sydney central business district, in the local government area of the City of Fairfield.

The  recorded that Wetherill Park as having a resident population of 6,127. Just under half (47.5%) of these residents were born in Australia. The area is 11.2 km2.
Most residents live in the south-east corner, the larger portion of the suburb being an industrial area.

Wetherill Park sits on the southern border of Prospect Reservoir. Located partially in the suburb, the Smithfield-Wetherill Park Industrial Estate is the largest industrial estate in the southern hemisphere and is the centre of manufacturing and distribution in Greater Western Sydney.

History

Aboriginal culture
Aboriginal people from the Cabrogal clan of the Gandangara tribe, have lived in the area for more than 30,000 years.

White settlement
Wetherill Park was named after a businessman who offered  of his property to the State government as a park. The offer was accepted and the park was named after the donor. The first settlers in set up their homes north of the present school site at Wetherill Park. One hundred years ago, there were not enough homes in this suburb to need a school.

With the commencement of the Prospect Reservoir Waterworks, a local storekeeper, Samuel Booth, made available a section of his land for a school, free of charge. The school, called 'Macquarie Park', was located on the corner of Victoria and Daniel Streets being 365 Victoria Street, Wetheril Park. It opened in May 1882 with 8 children but it was changed in June 1882 to 'Boothtown' for Samuel Booth's involvement in the establishment of the school. In 1884 it became Reservoir Public School and in 1896, it became the Wetherill Park Public School. In 1986 the school made way for the Phuoc Hue Temple, and was relocated down the road to Lily Street and renamed William Stimson Public School, in honour of the first mayor of the City of Fairfield.

Street names
A characteristic of Wetherill Park is that all the streets are named after famous writers. Some examples include: Vidal Street (for Gore Vidal), Shakespeare Street (for William Shakespeare), Stevenson Street (for Robert Louis Stevenson), Locke Street (for John Locke), Gogol Place (for Nikolai Gogol), Swinburne Crescent (for Richard Swinburne), Homer Place (for Homer), Emerson Street (for Ralph Waldo Emerson), Wordsworth Street (for William Wordsworth), Dickens Road (for Charles Dickens), Longfellow Street (for Henry Wadsworth Longfellow), Chaucer Street (for Geoffrey Chaucer), Ainsworth Crescent (for William Harrison Ainsworth), Coleridge Road (for Samuel Taylor Coleridge), Frost Close (for Robert Frost), Gissing Street (for George Gissing), Maugham Crescent (for Somerset Maugham) and Langland Street (for William Langland).

Commercial areas
Stockland Wetherill Park is a major shopping centre in the area and features one of Australia's largest cinema complexes owned by Hoyts. The shopping centre opened in 1983, the first major expansion took place in 2003. In 2013 a second expansion saw the building complex expand to fill the entire lot, with parking moved underground and multi-story rooftop parking. The 2013 expansion cost over $200 million AUD and was complete in 2016. A large stand alone Chinese restaurant existed on the lot until the early 2000's. It hosted Chinese diplomats & VIPs as well as lavish Chinese New Year functions until the location was purchased by the Local Government and turned into the Wetherill Park Library.
Wetherill Park Shopping Centre (now known as Market Town) opened in the early 1980s on the corner of The Horsley Drive and Rossetti Street, adjacent to Emerson Street Reserve tennis courts. It originally featured approximately 25 specialty shops, including a Franklins supermarket. In recent years, the shopping centre underwent renovations which saw the shopping complex completely reformed, and the rear parking lot expanded. Today, the complex also features a bowling centre. An Aldi chain is also open in market town.
Greenway Plaza is a larger, outdoor shopping complex which stores such as features The Good Guys, Officeworks, Supercheap Auto, Spotlight and Homemaker. There are a few restaurants, cafes, a TAB, an employment service provider and Service NSW office within the complex.
Wetherill Park is home to the largest industrial estate in the Southern Hemisphere, with companies such as Jaguar, BMW, Subaru and Mercedes-Benz situated in the area. Despite the heavy industrial presence, the suburb maintains a coppice environment dominated by eucalyptus trees. Within the industrial estate there are furniture stores (Moshy Furniture, Café Lightning, Aaron's Furniture, etc.), home depot stores, car mechanic services and clothing factories, among others.

Transport
Transitway bus route T80 operated by Transit Systems Sydney, opened in 2003 and runs partly through Wetherill Park. It is also located close to the Westlink M7 Sydney Orbital motorway. The Horsley Drive is the major road which runs through Wetherill Park. Other major roads include Polding Street and Victoria Street.

Climate
Wetherill Park has a humid subtropical climate (Cfa) with warm to hot summers and cool, drier winters. Frost is not unheard of in winter. Afternoon thunderstorms can occur in the warm months.

Demographics
According to the 2021 Census, the most common ancestries in Wetherill Park were Australian 11.0%, Assyrian 10.7%, Italian 9.4%, English 8.7%, and Iraqi 7.4%.

43.2% of people were born in Australia. The most common countries of birth were Iraq 18.0%, Vietnam 3.2%, Italy 3.0%, Syria 2.4% and Croatia 1.6%.

The most common responses for religion were Catholic 46.4%, No Religion 10.1%, Not stated 6.2%, Assyrian Church of the East 6.1%, Islam 7.0% and Eastern Orthodox 6.1%. Overall, Christianity was the largest religious group reported (74.0%).

32.8% of people only spoke English at home. Other languages spoken at home included Arabic 12.4%, Assyrian Neo-Aramaic 9.5%, Chaldean Neo-Aramaic 6.3%, Spanish 5.0% and Vietnamese 3.9%. Combining the varieties of Assyrian and Chaldean, Neo-Aramaic will be the most common language at 15.8%.

Schools
 William Stimson Public School

Parks and recreation
The suburb features a large recreational park and an urban forest, Wetherill Park Nature Reserve. Adjacent to that Reserve is the Emerson Street Reserve, which is a 6-hectare, rectangular-shaped sports ground which features a walking track, a tennis facility, a skate park, a basketball court, cricket practice nets and a soccer field. Although not in the suburb, Rosford Street Reserve is adjacent to the eastern outskirts of Wetherill Park.

As part of Fairfield City Council's Parks Improvement Program, Shakespeare Park was upgraded in 2006.

Places of worship
Wetherill Park is home to a large Vietnamese Buddhist temple, Phuoc Hue Temple, which was visited by Prince Charles in 1994.

Notable residents
Wetherill Park was once home to famous Italian footballer, Christian Vieri.

References

Suburbs of Sydney
City of Fairfield